Helene Böhlau (22 November 1859 in Weimar – 26 March 1940 in Augsburg) was a German novelist.

Biography
She traveled much in the East, married Omar al-Raschid Bey (born as Friedrich Arnd) in Istanbul, and settled down in Munich. In 1888 her sketches of Weimar (Ratsmädelgeschichten) brought her a large measure of fame. She showed a leaning toward the Romantic school now and then, but on the whole her descriptions were realistic and her writing was imbued with passion.

Works
 Novellen (1882)
 Es hat nicht Sein Sollen (It shouldn't have been, 1891)
 Das Recht der Mutter (The mother's right, 1896; new ed., 1903)
 Neue Ratsmädel- und Weimarische Geschichten (1897)
 Halbtier (Half animal, 1899)
 Sommerbuch (1902)
 Die Kristallkugel (The crystal ball, 1903)
 Isebies (1911)

Notes

References

External links
 
 

1859 births
1940 deaths
Writers from Weimar
People from Saxe-Weimar-Eisenach
19th-century German novelists
20th-century German novelists
German women novelists
20th-century German women writers
19th-century German women writers